Ismaila Lassissi, sometimes also spelled Isimaila Lassissi (born 11 September 1969), is a former Ivorian rugby union footballer. He played as a flanker and as a number eight.

He played for Burotic Abidjan, in Ivory Coast and for Stade Rodez Aveyron and Castres Olympique, in France. He earned 8 caps for the Ivory Coast national team, from 1993 to 1995, without ever scoring. He was a member of the Ivorian Squad at the 1995 Rugby World Cup finals, playing in all the three games. Lassissi has not since been selected for his National Team.

External links

1969 births
Living people
Ivorian rugby union players
Rugby union flankers
Rugby union number eights
Ivorian expatriate rugby union players
Expatriate rugby union players in France
Ivorian expatriate sportspeople in France